Kickett is a surname. Notable people with the surname include:

 Professor Cheryl Kickett-Tucker (born ), research fellow at Curtin University, Western Australia involved with Aboriginal community development programs
 Dale Kickett (born 1968), Australian rules footballer
 Derek Kickett (born 1962), Australian rules footballer

See also
 Kickert
 Pickett